Clioscaphites is an extinct genus of ammonite belonging to the family Scaphitidae. Species in this genus are important index fossils of the Western Interior Seaway of the Coniacian to Santonian Ages of the Cretaceous.

References 

Mesozoic animals
Scaphitidae
Late Cretaceous ammonites of North America